The 2023 Kings League, also known as Kings League Infojobs due to sponsorship reasons, is the 1st season of Kings League, a Spanish seven-a-side football competition. It commenced on 1 January 2023 and is scheduled to end on 26 March 2023.

Venue 
The Kings League is being held at the Cupra Arena, located in the port of Barcelona. The Cupra Arena is part of the Logistics Activities Area (ZAL in Spanish) of the Port of Barcelona. On 20 January 2023, Gerard Piqué and FC Barcelona president Joan Laporta announced that the semifinals, final and third place match of the winter split playoffs would be held as a 'Final Four' event at the Camp Nou, the home ground of FC Barcelona, on March 26, 2023.

Teams 
The kit manufacturer for all teams is Adidas while the kit sponsor for all teams is InfoJobs. All teams have an "11th Player" who usually is a former professional football player and a "12th Player", a guest player who can be different for each match date

Former 11th Players 
Although in theory an "11th Player" is meant to stay with the team for the entire season, they can be replaced in the event of injury or inability to balance the league with other professional commitments.

12th Player 
Kings League teams have the possibility to invite one player (the "12th Player") each matchday.

1. Kunisports did not feature a 12th Player on Week 7.
2. Enigma competed in a lucha libre mask. His identity has not been disclosed.

Winter Split (January–March 2023)

Regular phase standings

Playoffs 
The playoffs are slated to be held from 24 to 26 March 2023.

Transfer market
A transfer market is set to open among all participating teams in the month of April 2023, between the Winter and Summer Splits. The rules of the market were outlined in separate livestreams before the end of the Winter Split regular season:
 The market will operate in a way similar to a virtual economy, with each team starting with a virtual €100 million budget.
 Each team chairperson can set a buyout clause for their team's ten regular players. The combined amount of money allocated by a team in the buyout clause values cannot exceed €300 million, and every player's buyout clause must be worth a minimum €1 million. There is no maximum value for a single player's buyout clause, as long as the team complies with the €300 million cap. If a team chairperson fails to present the buyout clause values by the agreed deadline, all their players will have a €30 million buyout clause.
 Guest players (11th and 12th Players) are excluded from the market.
 Teams can sign players through two different methods:
 Buying a player out by paying the amount of money stipulated in his buyout clause. If a buyout is completed, the player cannot refuse to leave his current team; however, if multiple teams attempt a buyout for the same player, the player is allowed to choose which team he will join.
 Negotiation between team chairpersons, which can include trading: players can be swapped for other players or exchanged for future draft picks.
 There will be a total of four transfer windows. During the first window, only signing through buyout will be allowed.
 If a buyout is activated for a player for whom an offer had been accepted but not notified to the league, the buyout prevails over the offer.
 The money teams have left after the market ends can be spent during the Summer Split in purchasing additional secret weapons (including the possibility of adding a "13th Player" for a match), or paying fines.

Season statistics

Top goalscorers

Top assists

MVP of the week
After each match, a Most Valuable Player (also referred to as Simyo MVP for sponsorship reasons) is chosen. After the matchday finishes, a poll in Twitter is launched to determine which is the MVP of the week.

A list of all MVPs awarded can be found on KingsLeague's web.

External links
 Official website
 Official Twitch channel

References

2022–23 in Spanish football leagues